Rainbow Beach Provincial Park is a provincial park on Dauphin Lake, located in Manitoba, Canada. It has seasonal camping available, both serviced and unserviced. It is located 15 km east of Dauphin, Manitoba, in the Rural Municipality of Lakeshore.

References

See also
List of Manitoba parks

Provincial parks of Manitoba
Year of establishment missing

Parks in Parkland Region, Manitoba
Protected areas of Manitoba